Yvonne Jegede is a Nigerian actress, film producer, model, and television personality; notable for producing 3 is Company. She rose to prominence after she made a cameo appearance in the music video African Queen by 2Face Idibia alongside Annie Macaulay.

Early life and education
Yvonne Jegede was born in Agenebode, Edo State, Nigeria on the 25th of August, 1983. She had her primary and secondary education in Lagos State Nigeria before proceeding to the University of Cyprus, where she graduated with a bachelor's degree in International Relations.

Career
Yvonne Jegede started her movie career in 2004 when she featured in the Nollywood movie Missing Angels. Her first major camera debut came up in 2005 with her appearance in the now popular music video African Queen by 2Face Idibia. After her University education in 2012, she came back to Nollywood and starred in movies like Okafor's Law, Single and Married, 10 Days in Sun City among others. In 2015, she produced her first movie 3 is Company where she starred as the lead character. In late 2016, she was the cover in the wedding edition of Genevieve Nnaji's magazine.

Personal life
On 1 November 2021, Yvonne Jegede, who is a single mother celebrated her Son, Xavier Jegede third birthday and she declared on her Instagram page that life without her son is meaningless and that having him made her stronger. She also showered series of prayer and praises on her child.

Filmography 

 Silver spoon
 Okafor's law
 A night chic Squad
 Shot to kill
 A night before
 Just for Two
 Love and Cancer
 Rachel's Diary
 Unfinished Business
 The Axis
 My Best Friends Wedding

Awards 

 Best Actress of the Year at the Africa Magic
 Viewers Choice Awards,
 Nollywood Most Promising Actress in Nigeria at the City People Entertainment Awards 
 Best Actress in a Supporting Role at the Africa Movie Academy Award
 Most Promising Act to Watch at the Golden Icon Movie Academy Awards
 Nigerian Fitness Icon (NFI) award in 2016

References

1983 births
Living people
Nigerian film actresses
Nigerian film producers
Nigerian television personalities
University of Cyprus alumni
People from Edo State
Nigerian female adult models
Nigerian film award winners